Hotel Krone is the oldest hotel in Solothurn town, Switzerland founded in 1418. The rooms are decorated with authentic Louis XV or Biedermeier furniture and equipped with minibars and work desks.

During its history it hosted many famous people, including Casanova, Napoleon, Sophia Loren, Henry Kissinger and José Carreras.

Renovation in 2017 
The 4-star boutique hotel La Couronne reopened on 2 May 2017 after extensive renovations. All modernization work was completed in autumn of 2017 with the addition of the garage on Seilergasse and 9 additional atelier rooms in the dependence building.
 In August 2017, the hotel joined Swiss Historic Hotels and the restaurant was awarded 13 Gault Millau points.

See also 
List of oldest companies

References

External links 
Homepage
Location on Google Maps

Hotels in Switzerland
Restaurants in Switzerland
Companies established in the 15th century
15th-century establishments in Europe
Companies based in the canton of Solothurn
Solothurn
Hotels established in the 15th century